John Patrick O'Neill (born 11 March 1958) is a former footballer who played for the Northern Ireland national team, winning 39 caps, and scoring two goals. Born in Derry, Northern Ireland, he was a member of the Northern Ireland squads that played in the World Cup tournaments of 1982 and 1986. His final appearance for the national side came in their 3-0 defeat against Brazil in the 1986 tournament.

Club career
At club level, O'Neill played for Leicester City, QPR, and Norwich City. However, his spell with the Canaries was cut short, and he made just one appearance for Norwich - against Wimbledon in 1987. On the field for just 34 minutes, a horrendous tackle from Dons player John Fashanu so severely damaged O'Neill's knee ligaments that he never played another professional game, and finished his playing career. O'Neill began legal proceedings against Fashanu for the tackle that ended his career, before settling out of court for £70,000.

He was granted a testimonial at Carrow Road by Norwich in the 1988-89 season.

Management and administration
After his playing career ended, O'Neill had a spell from 1990 managing Finn Harps of the League of Ireland. He later moved back to his home city and became a member of the board of Derry City for a period.

Media work
Since retirement as a player, O'Neill is best known for being Jackie Fullerton's co-commentator on Northern Ireland international games.

International goals 
Scores and results list Northern Ireland's goal tally first

References

External links
 
 Flown from the Nest - John O'Neill Ex-Canaries.co.uk
 

1958 births
Living people
Sportspeople from Derry (city)
Association footballers from Northern Ireland
Northern Ireland international footballers
Leicester City F.C. players
Queens Park Rangers F.C. players
Norwich City F.C. players
1982 FIFA World Cup players
1986 FIFA World Cup players
League of Ireland managers
English Football League players
People educated at St Columb's College
Association football defenders
Football managers from Northern Ireland